The 50 Greatest Players in NBA History, also referred to as NBA's 50th Anniversary All-Time Team, were chosen in 1996 to honor the 50th anniversary of the founding of the National Basketball Association (NBA). It was the third anniversary team in the league. Fifty players were selected through a vote by a panel of media members, former players and coaches, and current and former general managers. In addition, the top ten head coaches and top ten single-season teams in NBA history were selected by media members as part of the celebration. The 50 players had to have played at least a portion of their careers in the NBA and were selected irrespective of position played.

The list was announced by NBA commissioner David Stern on October 29, 1996, at the hotel Grand Hyatt New York, the site of the Commodore Hotel, where the original NBA charter was signed in 1946. The announcement marked the beginning of a season-long celebration of the league's anniversary. Forty-seven of the fifty players were later assembled in Cleveland, during the halftime ceremony of the 1997 All-Star Game. At the time of the announcement, 11 players were active; all have subsequently retired.

Players selected

List
All have since retired. All of the selected players have been inducted into the Naismith Memorial Basketball Hall of Fame. At the time of the list, only Pete Maravich was deceased.

All 11 members from the 35th anniversary team were selected. Eight of the 10 players from the 25th anniversary team were chosen, with Bob Davies and Joe Fulks—who both last played in the 1950s—being omitted.

Selection process
The list was made through unranked voting completed by 50 selected panelists. Sixteen of the panelists were former players voting in their roles as players, 13 were members of the print and broadcast news media, and 21 were team representatives: contemporary and former general managers, head coaches, and executives. Of the last group, 13 were former NBA players. Players were prohibited from voting for themselves. Only three voting former players (Bill Bradley, Johnny Kerr, and Bob Lanier) were not selected to the team.

Voters

Top 10 Coaches in NBA History

Alongside the selection of the 50 greatest players was the selection of the Top 10 Coaches in NBA History. The list was compiled based upon unranked selection undertaken exclusively by members of the print and broadcast media who regularly cover the NBA. All 10 coaches named were alive at the time of the list's announcement, and five of them—Bill Fitch, Phil Jackson, Don Nelson, Pat Riley, and Lenny Wilkens—were then active. Six have since died: Red Holzman in 1998, Red Auerbach in 2006, Chuck Daly in 2009, Jack Ramsay in 2014, John Kundla in 2017, and Bill Fitch in 2022. Jackson was the last of the ten to coach in the NBA; he announced his retirement after the 2010–11 season. Nelson was the only member to have never won a championship as a coach, even though he won five as a player. Wilkens was the only member of the coaches list to have been selected as a member of the players list. All ten coaches are also members of the Naismith Memorial Basketball Hall of Fame, with Fitch the last member inducted in 2019.

Top 10 Teams in NBA History
Also included in the NBA's 50th-anniversary celebration was the selection of the Top 10 Teams in NBA History. The list was compiled based upon unranked selection undertaken exclusively by members of the print and broadcast media who regularly cover the NBA. Teams were chosen from among all single-season individual teams. Each team won the NBA championship, and they combined to average 66 wins per season. The 1995–96 Chicago Bulls had, at the moment, the best single-season record in NBA history with 72 wins.

Six out of the 30 NBA franchises (29 franchises at the time of announcement) had a team named to the list; the Boston Celtics, the Chicago Bulls, the Los Angeles Lakers and the Philadelphia 76ers had two teams selected.

Six players were on the roster of two teams on the list—Wilt Chamberlain with the 1966–67 Sixers and 1971–72 Lakers; James Edwards, Dennis Rodman, and John Salley with the 1988–89 Pistons and 1995–96 Bulls; and Michael Jordan and Scottie Pippen with the Bulls in both 1991–92 and 1995–96. Three other individuals both played for and coached honored teams, all of whom completed this "double" with a single franchise—K. C. Jones with the Celtics as a player in 1964–65 and coach in 1985–86, Billy Cunningham with the Sixers as a player in 1966–67 and coach in 1982–83, and Pat Riley with the Lakers as a player in 1971–72 and coach in 1986–87. Phil Jackson, head coach of the Bulls from 1989 to 1998, was the only man to coach two teams that made the list. Although Jackson was under contract to the Knicks as a player in their 1969–70 championship season, he did not play that season as he was recovering from spinal fusion surgery.

The Hall of Famers listed for each individual team are solely those inducted as players, and do not include those inducted in other roles. Players whose names are italicized were inducted after the announcement of the ten best teams.

Notes

 American Basketball Association (ABA) teams other than those admitted into the NBA in 1976 are not included; each year is linked to an article about that particular NBA season.
 Each year is linked to an article about the NBA Finals in that year.
 Inducted into Naismith Memorial Basketball Hall of Fame as coach; Bill Sharman was inducted as both a player and a coach
 A sixth player on this team, Sanders, was inducted into the Hall as a contributor in August 2011.
He retired at the beginning of the next season.

See also

ABA All-Time Team
NBA anniversary teams

Notes

References

General

Specific

External links
 NBA.com: The 50 Greatest Players page
 NBA.com: Top 10 Coaches page
 NBA.com: Top 10 Teams page

50
1996–97 NBA season
Golden jubilees